The 2007 CFL Draft took place on Wednesday, May 2, 2007. 47 players were chosen from among 911 eligible players from Canadian Universities across the country, as well as Canadian players playing in the NCAA. Of the 47 draft selections, 31 players were drafted from Canadian Interuniversity Sport institutions.

Forfeitures
 Edmonton forfeited their sixth round selection after selecting Jermaine Lee in the 2006 Supplemental Draft.

Draft order

Round one

Round two

Round three

Round four

Round five

Round six

References

Canadian College Draft
Cfl Draft, 2007